"D Rose" is a song by American rapper Lil Pump, and the third single from his self-titled debut album Lil Pump (2017). It was released on June 9, 2017 through SoundCloud along with his song "Flex Like Ouu", after a music video directed by Cole Bennett was previously released on January 30, 2017. The song is named after basketball player Derrick Rose. Along with his songs "Boss" and "Gucci Gang", the song helped Lil Pump gain attention, amassing over 30 million plays on SoundCloud.

Critical reception
Paul Thompson of Complex wrote, "'D Rose' is appropriately dreamlike, but the beat does most of the heavy lifting, with Pump's vocals punching in left and right and feeling around for a pocket that never quite reveals itself to him."

Charts

Certifications

References

2017 singles
2017 songs
Lil Pump songs
Songs written by Lil Pump
Music videos directed by Cole Bennett
Warner Records singles